Anne Meiman Hughes (née Meiman; born July 3, 1965) is an American politician who is the member of the Connecticut House of Representatives from the 135th district, serving Weston, Easton and parts of Redding in Fairfield County. She is a member of the Democratic Party and serves as Co-Chair of the Progressive Democratic Caucus.

Early life and education 
Anne Hughes was born July 3, 1965 in Fairfield, Connecticut, to Philip Phil Meiman (1933-2010) and Kathryn Meiman (b. 1934). Her father was a teacher in the Fairfield Public Schools, who also served on the Fairfield Conservation Commission from 1997 to 2007. Her mother is a registered nurse, homemaker and educator. She was raised there and attended the public schools as well.

She earned a Bachelor of Arts in Art and Political Science from the College of New Rochelle and a Master of Social Work at the University of New England in 2014.

Professional experience 
Hughes works as a Licensed Master Social Worker for Jewish Senior Services' Institute on Aging and as coordinator for the Center of Elder Abuse Prevention. She was formerly a Program Director at CLASP Homes Inc., and she co-founded Norwalk Peacemakers, a non-profit organization.

Political career

Election
Hughes was elected in the general election on November 6, 2018, winning 54 percent of the vote over 45 percent for Republican candidate Adam Dunsby. She is the first Democrat to represent the district in over three decades. Anne serves on Aging, Human Services and Labor and Public Employees Committees of the Connecticut General Assembly.

Anne is an advocate for family medical leave, and was a living donor of a kidney to her godson in 2015, and has given speeches and testimonials at the Georgetown Transplant Institute where the surgeries were performed.

References

 Connecticut Democrats
Hughes, Anne 
Living people
21st-century American politicians
21st-century American women politicians
Women state legislators in Connecticut
1965 births